Ko Reibun (born September 24, 1981 in Hebei), né Nie Yuncong, is a professional Go player.

Biography 
Rin became a professional in 1997. He is the son of one of the greatest Chinese players, Nie Weiping 9 dan, and his mother is Kong Xiangming 8 dan. He moved to Japan to study under Yasuro Kikuchi. He is a Nihon Ki-in pro taking part in tournaments.

He is now a naturalised Japanese, and has a Japanese wife Kobayashi Sayaka, daughter of Kobayashi Satoru. He is currently 6 dan.

References
 Nihon Ki-in official page, some content in English
Gobase page

Notes

1981 births
Living people
Chinese Go players
Japanese Go players
Chinese emigrants to Japan
Sportspeople from Hebei